Haryana Archery Association  (HAA) is the state governing body of archery in Haryana. It is a non-profit, government funded organisation under the Archery Association of India. HAA is affiliated to Archery Association of India and Haryana Olympic Association. Its current president is Captain Abhimanyu Sindhu.

References

Archery
Archery in India
Archery organizations
Sport in Haryana